Tonga (native name Chitonga) is a Bantu language spoken mainly in the Nkhata Bay District of Malawi. The number of speakers is estimated to be 170,000. According to the Mdawuku wa Atonga (MWATO) (formerly the Nkhata Bay Tonga Heritage) there are also significant numbers of speakers living elsewhere in Malawi and in neighbouring countries.

The Tonga language of Malawi is described as "similar" to Tumbuka, and Turner's dictionary (1952) lists only those words which differ from the Tumbuka, with the added comment that "the Tonga folk, being rapid speakers, slur or elide the final syllable of many words, e.g. kulira becomes kuliya, kukura becomes kukuwa, kutoa becomes kuto’." Tonga (Nyasa), i.e. Malawian Tonga, is grouped in the Glottolog classification along with Tumbuka in a single group.

Malawian Tonga is classified by Guthrie as being in Zone N15, whereas the Zambian Tonga is classified as Zone M64 and can thus be considered a different language.

Tones
The Tonga language is tonal, with underlying tones High and non-High. Unlike Tumbuka, the high tones are not confined to the penultimate syllable of the word, but can be found in different places in different words.

Most verb roots in Tonga are toneless, although there are a few such as bangulá "shout" or sambilá "learn/swim" which have a tone on the final syllable of the stem. When a tone is final, as in the verb bangulá "shout", it tends to spread backwards to the penultimate syllable, giving the result bangǔlá (where ǔ represents a rising tone).

Tenses
Some of the Chitonga tenses are formed as follows:

Present habitual or continuous:
 ndívina –  I am dancing (root -vin-)

Monosyllabic verbs or verbs starting with a vowel add -t(ú)- in this tense:
 nditurgha – I eat, I am eating (root -ly-)
 nditénda – I am walking/travelling (root -end-)

Present Perfect 
  ndavina - I have danced
 ndargha - I have eaten
 ndayenda - I have walked

Past simple:
 ndinguvína – I danced
 ndingurgha – I ate
 ndingwenda – I walked

Past habitual:
 ndavínanga – I was dancing or I used to dance
ndarghanga – I was eating or I used to eat
ndayendanga – I was walking or I used to walk

Simple Future:
 ndívinengi – I will dance
ndirghengi – I will eat
ndiyendengi – I will walk

An example of Tonga
An example of a folktale in Tonga, Tumbuka and other languages of Northern Malawi is given in the Language Mapping Survey for Northern Malawi carried out by the Centre for Language Studies of the University of Malawi. The Chitonga version goes as follows:

(Translation: THE TORTOISE AND THE HARE

Tortoise went to beg food from people. To carry his bag, he tied it to a long string and wore it round his neck. As he walked along, the bag was coming behind him.

When he was on his way, Hare came up behind him and said, "I've found it, my bag!" Tortoise said "No, you're lying, see this string I've tied now I'm pulling it as I go." Hare refused to accept this and said "Let's go the Court, it will judge us." The Court examined the case and cut Tortoise's string which he'd tied the bag with. They took that bag and gave it to Hare. Another day when Hare was walking along, Tortoise found him and said, "I've got my tail!" Hare said, "Nonsense, this is my tail, Tortoise." Tortoise refused to accept this and said, "What I've got is mine." They went to the Court so that it could make a judgement. In that Court, the case went in Tortoise's favour. They cut off Hare's tail and gave it to Tortoise.)

(The Tumbuka version of this story can be found for comparison in the article Tumbuka language#An example of Tumbuka.)

Mdawuku wa aTonga (MWATO)
In August 2017 a cultural organisation originally known as the Nkhata Bay Tonga Heritage was established to promote Tonga language and culture. But shortly after its establishment the name was changed to Mdawuku wa aTonga (MWATO). The group honours well-known Malawians of Tonga origin and supports a band known as the Park Town Band, whose speciality is the local honala dance, danced by men and women wearing suits and hats. (The dance is named after the Hohner accordion, which is used for accompaniment.)

The chairman of the original organising committee, Rev. Maxwell Mezuwa Banda, is quoted as saying in 2017 that one of the aims of the organisation was to preserve the Tonga language, which he said was being swallowed up by Chichewa, more especially among youths. "We want to revive this language among the young ones. Otherwise, if we leave it as it is, in 10 years’ time, the language will be gone."

References

External links

Honala dance
Honala dance
Another version of the dance

Rufiji-Ruvuma languages
Languages of Malawi